2013–14 Premier League may refer to a number of professional sports league seasons:

 Association football

 2013–14 Armenian Premier League
 2013–14 Azerbaijan Premier League
 2013–14 Premier League of Belize
 2013–14 Premier League of Bosnia and Herzegovina
 2013–14 Egyptian Premier League
 2013–14 Premier League (England)
 2013–14 Israeli Premier League
 2013–14 Kuwaiti Premier League
 2013–14 Lebanese Premier League
 2013–14 Maltese Premier League
 2013–14 National Premier League (Jamaica)
 2013–14 Premier Soccer League (South Africa)
 2013–14 Russian Premier League
 2013–14 Syrian Premier League
 2013–14 Ukrainian Premier League
 2013–14 Welsh Premier League

 Basketball

 2013–14 Irish Premier League season